Rainforest is a studio album by artist Paul Hardcastle, released in 1985 on the Profile Records label.

Track listing

Charts

References

External links 
 Paul Hardcastle at Discogs

1985 albums
Paul Hardcastle albums
Profile Records albums